The Roman Catholic Diocese of Dolisie is a Catholic diocese located in the city of Dolisie in the Ecclesiastical province of Pointe-Noire in the Republic of the Congo.

History
On 24 May 2013, Pope Francis established the Diocese of Dolisie from the Diocese of Nkayi.

Ordinaries
Bienvenu Manamika Bafouakouahou (24 May 2013 – 18 April 2020), appointed Coadjutor Archbishop of Brazzaville

References

Roman Catholic dioceses in the Republic of the Congo
Christian organizations established in 2013
Roman Catholic dioceses and prelatures established in the 21st century
Roman Catholic Ecclesiastical Province of Pointe-Noire